Tolhuaca Volcano is a stratovolcano straddling the border between the regions of Bío Bío and Araucanía in southern Chile. The volcano has been shaped by glacial erosion, which contrasts with the relatively smooth slopes of its neighbor Lonquimay, due to the younger age of this latter volcano.

The volcano dominates the landscape vistas of Tolhuaca National Park, but is not actually located within its borders. The volcano's slopes are covered in forests. These forests are predominantly araucaria trees among others. There are also numerous small lakes known as lagunas among the scenery.

See also
 List of volcanoes in Chile
 Malalcahuello-Nalcas
 Callaqui
 Sierra Nevada
 Llaima

References 

 

Volcanoes of Araucanía Region
Volcanoes of Biobío Region
Mountains of Chile
Stratovolcanoes of Chile
Pleistocene stratovolcanoes
Holocene stratovolcanoes